Alex Bogusky is a designer, marketer, author, and consumer advocate; and was an advertising executive and principal of the firm Crispin Porter + Bogusky. Bogusky left CP+B in 2010. In July 2010, he retired from the advertising industry. In October 2010, he announced via Twitter that he would be leaving self-created post of "chief insurgent officer" at advertising holding company MDC Partners to now being the lead "insurgent in the new consumer revolution" at his new venture, FearLess Cottage. Bogusky has since returned to CP+B under the title "chief creative engineer." In January 2020 he announced that he will leave CPB gradually over the next couple of months.

Background
Alex Bogusky was born on July 31, 1963 in Miami, Florida.  He attended North Miami Elementary School and graduated from North Miami Senior High School in 1981.
His father Bill Bogusky and his uncle Albert Bogusky, ran Miami-based design shop, The Brothers Bogusky. His mother Dixie, was an art director for several magazines until she eventually joined the family design business. 
Alex is married and has two children.

Advertising career

Bogusky was the 16th employee of advertising agency Crispin Porter in 1989. He became Creative Director of the agency five years later, was named a partner in 1997 and became Co-Chairman in January 2008.

In 2002, he was inducted into the American Advertising Federation's Hall of Achievement. In 2009 he received an honorary doctorate from the University of Colorado Boulder. He was also named Creative Director of the Decade in Adweek magazine's Best of 2000s issue.

Bogusky was the Chief Creative Officer of MDC Partners Inc. from January to July 2010.

Bogusky partnered with SodaStream International in 2012 to design a 30-second TV commercial promoting sustainability. The ad showed thousands of soda bottles exploding while people make drinks using their Sodastream machines. It was banned in the United Kingdom on account of being deemed "a denigration of the bottled drinks market." A version of the commercial is expected to be shown at Super Bowl XLVII in February 2013.

After an eight-year hiatus from Crispen Porter + Bogusky, Bogusky returned as chief creative engineer in 2018 in a move to revitalize the agency and redefine advertising. In January 2020 he announced that he will leave CPB gradually over the next couple of months.

Bibliography
 2011 Baked In (with John Winsor)
 2009 The 9 Inch Diet (with Chuck Porter and Sam Crispin)

FearLess Revolution

From his base at the FearLess Cottage in Boulder, CO, Bogusky has expanded his role as brand advocate to also being a consumer and social advocate. In 2010 and 2011, he broadcast a live-streaming online talk show to discuss what he sees as a new relationship between people, brands and culture. This new relationship emphasizes transparency, sustainability, democracy and collaboration among businesses and consumers.

In October, 2010, Bogusky called on the public to help write a new Consumer Bill of Rights for the 21st Century.

Partnering with friend Rob Schuham and his wife Ana Bogusky, the FearLess Cottage serves as a creative consultancy, business incubator, and media laboratory.

COMMON

In January 2011, Bogusky and Schuham partnered with designer John Bielenberg to launch COMMON, a creative community for accelerating social ventures under the shared values of a unified brand. COMMON is described as part community, part business prototyper, and part collaborative brand; a network of creative people prototyping progressive ventures designed to solve social problems.

Boomtown

In January 2014, Bogusky joined with Toby Krout, Stephen Groth and Jose Vieitez to launch Boomtown Boulder, a Colorado based Seed accelerator aimed at funding and developing startups in the industries of internet, mobile and software — particularly firms in the media, design, marketing and ad tech sectors.

Mountain Bike YouTube Channel
Bogusky has a YouTube channel providing lessons to the over 40's called Joy of Bike, which includes guest appearances from various MTBers and MTB teachers including Lee McCormack.

References

External links 
 Alex Bogusky on Twitter
 Interview with Forbes, 2012
 Interview with AdAge, 2012
 Interview with Fast Company, 2008
 50 People Who Matter, 2006, by Business 2.0
 2002 Hall Of Fame Inductee in the American Advertising Federation
 Article about the founding of Boomtown

1963 births
Living people
American advertising executives
Businesspeople from Miami
Businesspeople from Boulder, Colorado